Eugenia crassipetala is a species of plant in the family Myrtaceae. It is endemic to Mauritius.  Its natural habitat is subtropical or tropical dry forests.

References

crassipetala
Endemic flora of Mauritius
Critically endangered plants
Taxonomy articles created by Polbot